Intercity 2, short IC2, is an Intercity train formed by bilevel rail cars of Deutsche Bahn Fernverkehr. It has been in operation since December 2015. 

In order to be able to modernize old Intercity cars and to increase the vehicle reserve of the long-distance traffic, Bombardier Twindexx double-deck coaches are used in inter-city rail traffic with a maximum speed of 160 km/h. The locomotive is a DBAG Class 146.

These kind of coaches are used in German Regional-Express trains, for Intercity services the coaches will get a more comfortable interior than in regional train double-decker coaches. In both classes only open coaches are provided, there will be no dining car. The double-decker coaches have been in service since 2015. Unlike most previous IC stock the new trains, marketed as "InterCity 2" by DB have a top speed of 160 km/h and are mainly intended for routes where higher speeds aren't possible or would offer little or no benefit with the ICE 4 to take over routes with maximum speeds between 160 km/h and 250 km/h. The IC2 is also intended to expand the Intercity network to cities that had lost their long-distance service upon withdrawal of the Interregio.

Since 2020, Deutsche Bahn also uses 17 Stadler KISS trainsets as IC2 trains on the Dresden-Berlin-Rostock line.

References

Railway coaches of Germany
Deutsche Bahn
Double-decker rail vehicles